Kelvin Khong Boon Leong  (born 18 January 1976) is a Singaporean major-general who has been serving as Chief of Air Force since 2019.

Education
Khong was educated at Hwa Chong Junior College before he was awarded the Singapore Armed Forces Overseas Scholarship in 1995. He also attended the Singapore Youth Flying Club. 

Khong graduated from the Imperial College London in 1999 with a Master of Engineering with first class honours degree. In 2007, he attended the United States Air Command and Staff College and graduated with a Master of Military Operational Art and Science degree in 2008. He subsequently completed a Master of Business Administration with honours degree at the International Institute for Management Development in 2012.

Military career
Khong enlisted in the Singapore Armed Forces (SAF) in 1995 and served in the Republic of Singapore Air Force (RSAF) as a F-16 and F-15SG pilot. In 2019, he succeeded Mervyn Tan as Chief of Air Force.

Awards and decorations 

  Public Administration Medal (Military) (Gold), in 2020.
  Public Administration Medal (Military) (Silver), in 2014.
  Long Service Medal (Military), in 2020.
  Singapore Armed Forces Long Service and Good Conduct (20 Years) Medal
  Singapore Armed Forces Long Service and Good Conduct (10 Years) Medal with 15 year clasp
  Singapore Armed Forces Good Service Medal
  Honorary Officer of the Order of Australia, 8 February 2023. For distinguished service in fostering the military relationship between the Republic of Singapore and Australia through strategic vision, outstanding personal commitment and exceptional leadership, and in recognition of his role in supporting Australia during times of great need.

  Basic Parachutist Badge

Personal life 
Khong is married with two sons and a daughter.

References 

Living people
Singaporean people of Chinese descent
Chief of the Republic of Singapore Air Force
Hwa Chong Institution alumni
Alumni of Imperial College London
Air Command and Staff College alumni
International Institute for Management Development alumni
Recipients of the Long Service Medal (Military) (Singapore)
Recipients of the Pingat Pentadbiran Awam (Tentera)
1976 births
21st-century Singaporean people
Honorary Officers of the Order of Australia